Hypericum barbatum is a species of flowering plant in the family Hypericaceae. It is native to southeastern Europe, especially in Greece. The sepals bear many long silky hairs hence the specific name barbatum meaning "bearded".

Variants/subspecies
Hypericum barbatum has 20 known variants or subspecies. The five most prominent are listed.
Hypericum barbatum subsp. macedonicum
Hypericum barbatum f. acutifolium
Hypericum barbatum f. barbatum
Hypericum aucheri var. punctato-fimbriatum
Hypericum calabricum

References

barbatum
Flora of Southeastern Europe